Tillandsia cotagaitensis is a plant species in the genus Tillandsia. This species is endemic to Bolivia.

References

cotagaitensis
Flora of Bolivia